Ricky Kato (born 5 July 1994) is an Australian amateur golfer from Sydney, Australia.

His most memorable moment was when he received the Byron Nelson International Junior Award in Texas.

Tournament wins
2011 Australian All Schools Stroke Play
2012 Tasmanian Open

Team appearances
Australian Men's Interstate Teams Matches (representing New South Wales): 2012 (winners), 2013, 2014

Australian male golfers
Amateur golfers
Golfers from Sydney
1994 births
Living people
21st-century Australian people